Rolf Wenkhaus (9 September 1917 – 31 January 1942) was a German child actor who is best remembered for his role of Emil Tischbein in the 1931 film Emil and the Detectives.

Early life
Born in Berlin, Germany, Rolf Wenkhaus was the son of actor Kurt Wenkhaus (1891–1965).

Film career
Wenkhaus made his film debut at age 14 in 1931 as a child actor in the starring role of Emil in the Gerhard Lamprecht-directed adventure film Emil and the Detectives for Universum Film AG. The film was based on Erich Kästner's 1929 novel of the same name, and proved to be commercially successful. He won the casting against thousands of other boys.

Emil was followed by the film comedy Spoiling the Game (1932) with Heinz Rühmann, but Wenkhaus' role in this film was only of minor nature. In 1933 he appeared in one of the Third Reich's first propaganda films S.A.-Mann Brand as Erich Lohner, a juvenile member of the Hitler Youth who selflessly sacrifices himself at film's end to save a comrade. Like many Nazi propaganda films of the period, S.A.-Mann Brand was banned from viewing for many years following World War II. S.A.-Mann Brand was his last film.

Death
After the outbreak of World War II, Wenkhaus enlisted in the military. At the time of his death, aged 24, he was in the aircrew of a Focke-Wulf Fw 200 Condor, a four-engine bomber that specialized in attacks on shipping.  Wenkhaus's plane, with identification code F8 MH 0093, was shot down on 31 January 1942, off the coast of Bloody Foreland in County Donegal, Ireland by HMS Genista, a British  being utilized as a convoy escort vessel. The entire aircrew of six was killed. The body of the pilot, Werner Bornefeld, washed up at Bunbeg two weeks later, and was eventually reburied at a German War Cemetery at Glencree, Ireland.

Wenkhaus would be one of three young actors from Emil and the Detectives to be killed while serving in the military in World War II. Co-stars Hans Joachim Schaufuß would be killed in action at age 22 in October 1941 in Oryol and Hans Albrecht Löhr would be killed in action at age 21 in August 1942 on the Eastern Front.

Filmography
{| class="wikitable"
|-
! Year
! Title
! Role
! Notes
|-
|1931|| Emil and the Detectives' || Emil Tischbein ||
|-
|1932|| Spoiling the Game || ||
|-
|1933|| S.A.-Mann Brand || Erich Lohner || (final film role)
|}

References

Bibliography
 John Holmstrom, The Moving Picture Boy: An International Encyclopaedia from 1895 to 1995'', Norwich, Michael Russell, 1996, p. 80.

External links
 

1917 births
1942 deaths
German male film actors
German male child actors
Male actors from Berlin
Luftwaffe personnel killed in World War II
20th-century German male actors
Military personnel from Berlin
Aviators killed by being shot down